Pachymic acid is a naturally occurring steroid that can be extracted from the parasitic fungus Wolfiporia extensa (synonym Wolfiporia cocos). The dried sclerotia of the fungus is used as a traditional Chinese medicine, and pachymic acid is thought to be the principal  bioactive component of it.

Effects 
Pachymic acid is known to inhibit the Epstein–Barr virus and to inhibit the snake venom phospholipase A2. It also has antitumor and anti-inflammatory properties.

References

Lanostanes

carboxylic acids

Acetate esters